Zhao Shaolin (born October 1946) is a former Chinese politician who spent most of his career in Jiangsu province. Beginning in the 1990s, Zhao served as the mayor, then Communist Party Secretary, of the city of Huaiyin (now Huai'an). In 1998 he became the Secretary General of the Jiangsu provincial Party Committee, in charge of the execution of provincial party policy. He retired from politics in November 2006. Subsequently, he became vice-president of the non-profit China Aging Development Foundation. He was investigated by the Communist Party's anti-graft body in 2014 for corruption, then expelled from the Communist Party; he faces criminal charges related to bribery and foreign exchange fraud.

Biography
Zhao was born and raised in Yuanping City, Shanxi province, during the Republic of China.

In 1965, he entered the Harbin Institute of Military Engineering, majoring in radio measurement, after graduating in 1970 he was assigned to Nanjing Bridge Machinery Works.

He became involved in politics in August 1965 and joined the Chinese Communist Party in April 1973.

Beginning in 1982, he served in several posts in Nanjing, capital of Jiangsu province, including party chief of Gulou District, and Deputy Party Secretary and Secretary General of the Nanjing Party Committee.

In September 1992, he became the Deputy Party Secretary and Mayor of Huaiyin; he was re-elected in 1993. He was elevated to party chief of Huaiyin in 1994.

In June 1998, he was promoted to become the Secretary General of the provincial party committee, and a provincial Party Standing Committee member. He was re-elected in March 2000, and began his third term in April 2003.

In December 2006, he became the First Vice-president of the China Aging Development Foundation.

Investigation
On October 11, 2014, the state media reported that he was being investigated by the Central Commission for Discipline Inspection of the Chinese Communist Party for "serious violations of laws and regulations".

On August 14, 2015, Zhao was expelled from the Chinese Communist Party after investigation by the CCDI. It was said that Zhao violated "political discipline, political rules, and organizational discipline, formed cliques within the party." The CCDI also accused Zhao of unduly aiding in the business interests of his son and visiting "private clubs", attending banquets to give cash gifts and give bribes along with his son. He was indicted on two criminal charges: bribery and fraudulent purchase of foreign exchange.

Zhao was sentenced to four years in prison and fined 15 million yuan (US$2.19 million) on May 18, 2017.

Personal life
Zhao's son, Zhao Jin, was a businessman who worked in Tianjin.

References

External links

1946 births
Living people
People's Republic of China politicians from Shanxi
Chinese Communist Party politicians from Shanxi
Political office-holders in Shanxi
Politicians from Xinzhou
Expelled members of the Chinese Communist Party
Chinese politicians convicted of corruption